The Jockey Club Live is a live music promoter company, who work alongside The Jockey Club (the largest racecourse group in the UK) to produce large scale outdoor concerts at major racecourses.

The Jockey Club Live was founded by Andrew Wilkinson and Simon Halden, who previously worked on tours for acts such as The Rolling Stones, Pink Floyd, Robbie Williams and Kylie Minogue.

Since The Jockey Club Live launched in 2014 it has promoted over 120 concerts with a combined attendance of over 1 million, and was revealed by Music Week as the UK’s 6th largest music promoter.

2014
In 2014 Music Week revealed that The Jockey Club Live was the sixth largest live music promoter in the UK based on attendances, having staged live music after racing for nearly 300,000 people in its first year of operation.

Between 31 May and 6 September 2014, the company staged 29 events across 9 racecourses, including performances from:
 Sir Tom Jones
 Jessie J
 Kaiser Chiefs
 Beach Boys
 Dizzee Rascal
 James Blunt
 Boyzone
 Wet Wet Wet

2015
In February 2015 The Jockey Club Live announced that Kylie Minogue would be performing at Newmarket Racecourse and Haydock Park Racecourse.

Tickets for these shows went on sale on 6 February 2014, with Kylie Minogue’s Newmarket concert selling out 30 minutes after tickets were released.

Between 19 June and 29 August 2015, the company staged 16 events across 6 racecourses, including performances from:
 Kylie Minogue
 Status Quo (band)
 Kaiser Chiefs
 Spandau Ballet
 Madness (band)
 Boyzone
 Sir Tom Jones
 McBusted

In September 2015 The Jockey Club Live announced a new partnership with promoter Live Nation UK.

Under the new agreement Live Nation UK provides live music promotion expertise to Jockey Club Live and assumes responsibility for booking artists to appear at the company’s shows.

2016
Between 13 May and 27 August 2016, the company staged 19 events across 7 racecourses, including performances from:
 Deacon Blue
 Sir Tom Jones
 The Corrs
 Will Young
 Jess Glynne
 Kaiser Chiefs
 Busted (band)
 Tears for Fears
 Bryan Adams
 Mark Ronson
 Lisa Stansfield
 Little Mix

Since 2017, The Jockey Club Live has operated as an independent promoter.

2017
Between 19 May and 26 August 2017, the company staged 21 events across 8 racecourses, including performances from:
 Kaiser Chiefs
 Olly Murs
 Clean Bandit with Louisa Johnson
 Jess Glynne
 Little Mix
 The Jacksons
 Sir Tom Jones
 Culture Club
 Texas (band)
 James (band)
 Chase & Status

2018
Between 18 May and 25 August 2018, the company staged 19 events across 6 racecourses, including performances from:
 The Lightning Seeds
 Plan B (musician)
 Demi Lovato
 Craig David
 Paloma Faith
 James Blunt
 George Ezra
 The Magic of Motown
 Nile Rodgers & Chic (band)
 The Vamps (British band)

2019
Between 17 May and 17 August 2019, the company staged 19 events across 6 racecourses, including performances from:
 Madness (band)
 Jess Glynne
 Nile Rodgers & Chic (band)
 UB40
 Kaiser Chiefs
 Sigala
 Thriller Live
 Rudimental
 Pete Tong & The Heritage Orchestra
 Bananarama
 Years & Years
 Craig David

2021
Between 23 July and 28 August 2021, the company staged 3 events across 6 racecourses, including performances from:
 Tom Jones
 Olly Murs
 Craig David
 Jess Glynne
 Rick Astley
 McFly

2022
Between 10 June and 12 August 2022, the company staged 14 events across 4 racecourses, including performances from:
 Nile Rodgers & Chic (band)
 Paloma Faith
 Rudimental
 The Script
 Madness (band)
 Queen Symphonic
 Anne-Marie
 Simply Red
 The Wombats
 Pete Tong & The Heritage Orchestra

References

External links
 

Entertainment companies of the United Kingdom
Music promoters